Kau dan Aku is a Malaysian adaptation drama from a Venezuelan television series called Somos Tu Y Yo. This drama airs at Astro Ria (104) every Saturday at 10 PM (Local Time).

Plot 
Mila broke up with Aril at the past time. Mila continues learning at one College called Harmoni College and Mila meets again with Aril. He is still  in love with Mila but this time, Aril has a new girlfriend called Farah, the antagonist in this drama. Then, Mila meets Akim and falls in love with him which makes Aril jealous.

Cast 
 Akim (AF7) as Akim
 Mila (AF5) as Mila
 Aril(AF7) as Aril
 Ika Nabila (AF6) as Fitri
 Raja Farah as Farah
 Noni (AF5) as Lisa
Amar Baharin (Anak Wayang) as Ashraf
 Anita Baharom as Anita
 Hairey Azhak as Ali Azwan
 Puteri Fatin Nasuha as Cici
 Farish Aziz as Farish
 Sabrina Ali as Puan Linda
 Azizah Mahzan as Puan Luthfia
Nurul Huda Wahab
Riezman Khuzaimi
Nurlina
Sherry Merlis

External links 
 Official website

Malaysian drama television series